604 Records (stylized as VIOIV Records) is a music production company. It is named after area code 604 of the Lower Mainland, where the company's offices are located.

History
The company was co-founded by Nickelback lead singer Chad Kroeger and attorney Jonathan Simkin, founder of Simkin Artist Management, in 2001, and launched in 2002. Their records are distributed in Canada by Warner Music Group.

Simkin launched the companion label Light Organ Records in 2010 to release music by indie rock bands who he felt did not fit with 604's image.

In 2014, 604 Records relocated to a larger office and opened 604 Studios, a multimedia production facility featuring two recording studios, soundstage and in-house production team.

In March 2022, the company announced plans to launch an NFT platform.

Notable artists currently represented by 604 Records

 Carly Rae Jepsen
 Coleman Hell
 Dirty Radio
 Josh Ramsay
 Marianas Trench 
 My Darkest Days

Notable artists formerly represented by 604 Records

 Dallas Smith
 Daniel Wesley
 Faber Drive
 Jakalope
 Jessie Farrell
 One Bad Son
 Ralph
 Small Town Pistols
 Suzie McNeil
 The Suits XL
 Theory of a Deadman
 Thornley
 Tommy Lee

See also 

 List of record labels

References

External links
 

2002 establishments in British Columbia
Canadian independent record labels
Companies based in Vancouver
Record labels established in 2001
Labels distributed by Warner Music Group
Nickelback